The CBF600 is a middleweight motorcycle made by Honda. There are 2 models in the family, CBF600N is the 'naked' version and CBF600S is the half faired one, the differences consisting just in the front fairing and headlamp block

First generation (2004–2007) - code PC38

The older CB500 middleweight motorcycle was not compliant with the European emission standards, so Honda introduced a new design based on existing Hornet engine and gave it a look meant to inspire safety and to appeal returning riders, new riders or women. The EURO2 standards are met, while ABS is optional (factory assembly) on both naked and half-faired models. A centre stand comes standard with the ABS version only. The seat is adjustable with 3 positions, while the windscreen has also 2 positions meeting most riders' demands. The gearbox and the engine are optimised for smooth power delivery. 4 colours were offered for the faired version- black, dolphin grey, pearl red and metallic blue.

Second generation (2007–2013) - code PC43

Advancing emission standards are met with the new EURO3 compliant model in 2008. The engine is a detuned CBR600RR 2007 model with fuel injection, improving the mileage from 5–7 litres per 100 km to 4–5 litres per 100 km while keeping the same maximum power output. The fuel tank capacity was increased by one litre, the new chassis is aluminium cast, and the engine colour is now metallic-grey instead of black. The colour scheme was kept for 2008 and 2009. In 2010, black-red, white-red and white-blue colour combinations were added for the faired version.

Specifications

References

CBF600
Motorcycles introduced in 2004

fr:Honda CBF#CBF 600